Swaraj is an Indian concept of self-governance.

Swaraj or Swarajya may also refer to:

Religion 
 Sanskrit sva-rāj, self-resplendent, self-luminous, shining of one's self (said of the Ashvins, Indra, Mitra, and Varuna); the supreme Being (Brahman)
 Sanskrit svā-rāj, the ruler of heaven, i. e. Indra

Politics
 Swarajya Sanghatana, organisation in Maharashtra, India
 Swaraj Party, Swarajaya Party, or Swarajya Party, an Indian political party formed in 1922
 Swaraj Party (Burma), a political party active in Burma in the 1920s

People
 Sushma Swaraj (1952-2019), Indian lawyer and politician
 Swaraj Kaushal (born 1952), Indian lawyer and politician, husband of Sushma Swaraj
 Swaraj Parkash (1923-2008), Indian naval officer
 Swaraj Prakash Gupta (1931–2007), Indian archaeologist and art historian

Other uses
 Swaraj (book), a 2012 book by Arvind Kejriwal
 Swaraj Mazda, an Indian automobile manufacturer
 Swaraj Tractors, an Indian tractor manufacturer
 Swarajya (magazine), a weekly magazine founded in 1956, closing 1980; relaunched as a monthly and online publication since 2014

See also
 Hindavi Swarajya, a term for socio-political movements seeking to remove foreign military and political influences from India, first used in 1645
 Indian Home Rule movement, founded in 1916 to obtain the status of Dominion for India within the British Empire